Patel is an Indian surname or title, predominantly found in the state of Gujarat, representing the community of land-owning farmers and later (with the British East India Company) businessmen, agriculturalists and merchants. Traditionally the title is a status name referring to the village chieftains during medieval times, and was later retained as successive generations stemmed out into communities of landowners, including Patidars, Kolis, Kurmis, some Parsis and Muslims. There are roughly 500,000 Patels outside India, including about 150,000 in the United Kingdom and about 150,000 in the United States. Nearly 1 in 10 people of Indian origin in the US is a Patel.

Etymology
The term patel derives from the word Patidar, literally "one who holds (owned) pieces of land called patis, implying a higher economic status than that of the landless, ultimately from Sanskrit paṭṭakīla, with the ending -dar (from Sanskrit "धार"—supporting, containing, holding) denoting ownership.

Geographical distribution
The surname historically originated in the Indian state of Gujarat, where it is amongst the most common of surnames. Today, the name is found across India, as well as in the Indian diaspora.

See also
 List of people with surname Patel
 Meet the Patels
 Patil
 Patil (surname)

References

Agricultural castes
Gujarati people
Gujarati-language surnames
Indian feudalism
Koli people
Koli subcastes
Koli titles
Occupational surnames
Social groups of Gujarat
Surnames of Indian origin